Kadalekai Parishe, is an annual groundnut fair held in Bangalore. This two-day fair is held near the Dodda Ganesha Temple in Basavanagudi. Apart from the Groundnuts, there are numerous stalls in the fair, selling Bangles, traditional toys and clay trinkets, plastic and glass dolls, Mehndi tattoos. There are a variety of food items, such as Bajji, Bonda, Batthaas (Coloured sugar candies), Kalyana seve or Bendu (Sugar coated gram) and Coloured sodas on sale during the fair. Over 200 groundnut vendors  were benefited and the total plastic consumption at the fair came down by over 60%.

Etymology

Kadalekai Parishe, is a Kannada word, which literally translates to Groundnut fair.

History 
After the idol was found, in the year 1537, Kempe Gowda, dedicated a temple to ‘Dodda Basava’ on top of the Basavanagudi hillock and installed the Idol. This temple is known as Bull Temple. Ever since, the farmers from surrounding villages come here every year and offer their annual harvest of groundnut as offering to Lord Basava. This is accompanied by the annual fair, which is known as the Kadlekai Parishe.

Legend

In the past, Basavanagudi was surrounded by villages like Sunkenahalli, Gavipuram Guttahalli, Mavalli, Dasarahalli and other places where groundnut was cultivated. On every full moon day a bull would charge into the groundnut fields and damage the crop. The farmers then offered prayers to Basava (Nandi) to stop this and pledged to offer their first crop.

Subsequently, an Idol of Basava was found close by. It has been said that, the Idol was growing rapidly, and the farmers nailed an iron peg on the head of the idol, which is visible in the form of a trishula even to this date.
Legend says that the night on which this Kadalekai Parishe used to end, Lord Basavanna - The big Bull, used to come in the animal form and eat up all the groundnut and peels left overnight on the streets.

Event dates 
On every year, Kadalekai Parishe, the annual groundnut fair is held on the last Monday of Karthika Masa (month in Hindu calendar).  There is few days difference between Karthika month followed in Karnataka and Tamilnadu. This event dates are based on Karnataka version of Hindu Calendar.

21 November 2022- Main Event

Notes

Fairs in India